Jurassic Park, later known as Jurassic World, is an American science fiction adventure media franchise. It focuses on the cloning of dinosaurs through ancient DNA, extracted from mosquitoes that have been fossilized in amber. The franchise explores the ethics of cloning and genetic engineering, and the morals behind de-extinction.

The franchise began in 1990, with the release of Michael Crichton's novel Jurassic Park. A film adaptation, also titled Jurassic Park, was directed by Steven Spielberg and was released in 1993. Crichton then wrote a sequel novel, The Lost World (1995), and Spielberg directed its film adaptation, The Lost World: Jurassic Park (1997). Subsequent films have been released, including Jurassic Park III in 2001, completing the original trilogy of films. A fourth installment, Jurassic World, was released in 2015, marking the beginning of a new trilogy. Its sequel, Jurassic World: Fallen Kingdom, was released in 2018. A sixth film, Jurassic World Dominion, released in 2022, marks the conclusion of the second trilogy. Two Jurassic World short films have also been released: Battle at Big Rock (2019) and a Jurassic World Dominion prologue (2021).

Theropod dinosaurs like Tyrannosaurus and Velociraptor have had major roles throughout the film series. Other species, including Brachiosaurus and Spinosaurus, have also played significant roles. The series has also featured other creatures such as Mosasaurus and members of the pterosaur group, both commonly misidentified by the public as dinosaurs. The various creatures in the films were created through a combination of animatronics and computer-generated imagery (CGI). For the first three films, the animatronics were created by special-effects artist Stan Winston and his team, while Industrial Light & Magic (ILM) handled the CGI for all the films. The first film garnered critical acclaim for its innovations in CGI technology and animatronics. Since Winston's death in 2008, the practical dinosaurs have been created by other artists, including Legacy Effects and Image Engine (Jurassic World), Neal Scanlan (Jurassic World: Fallen Kingdom), and John Nolan (Jurassic World Dominion).

Paleontologist Jack Horner has served as the longtime scientific advisor on the films, and paleontologist Steve Brusatte was also consulted for Jurassic World Dominion. The original film was praised for its modern portrayal of dinosaurs. Horner said that it still contained many inaccuracies, but noted that it was not meant as a documentary. Later films in the series contain inaccuracies as well, for entertainment purposes. This includes the films' velociraptors, which are depicted as being larger than their real-life counterparts. In addition, the franchise's method for cloning dinosaurs has been deemed scientifically implausible, for a number of reasons.

On-screen portrayals 
The various creatures in the Jurassic Park and Jurassic World films were created through a combination of animatronics and computer-generated imagery (CGI). For each of the films, Industrial Light & Magic (ILM) has handled dinosaur scenes that required CGI. Throughout the film series, ILM has studied large animals such as elephants and rhinos, for reference in designing the digital dinosaurs.

Jurassic Park trilogy (1993–2001) 
For the original 1993 film Jurassic Park, director Steven Spielberg wanted to use practical dinosaurs as much as possible. He chose special-effects artist Stan Winston to create animatronic dinosaurs for the film, after seeing his work on the Queen Alien in the 1986 film Aliens. Winston said the Queen was easy compared to a dinosaur animatronic: "The queen was exoskeletal, so all of its surfaces were hard. There were no muscles, no flesh, and there was no real weight to it. The alien queen also didn't have to look like a real, organic animal because it was a fictional character -- so there was nothing in real life to compare it to. There was just no comparison in the difficulty level of building that alien queen and building a full-size dinosaur". Winston's team spent much time perfecting the animatronics, which used metal skeletons powered by electric motors. They molded latex skin that was then fitted over the robotic models, forming the exterior appearance. Up to 20 puppeteers were required to operate some of the dinosaurs. After filming concluded, most of the animatronics were disassembled.

For certain scenes, Spielberg had considered using go motion dinosaurs created by visual-effects artist Phil Tippett. Spielberg was disappointed with the results and opted for ILM's digital dinosaurs instead, although Tippett and his team of animators remained with the project to supervise the dinosaur movements. Tippett and ILM worked together to create the Dinosaur Input Device (DID), a robot shaped like a dinosaur skeleton. The DID included an array of sensors that captured various poses, which were then transferred into graphics software at ILM. Animatics and storyboards by Tippett were also used by the film crew as reference for action sequences. ILM based their CGI dinosaurs on Winston's models. Herds of dinosaurs were created through computer animation, using duplicate individuals which were slightly altered to give the illusion of multiple animals. The 127-minute film has 15 minutes of total screen time for the dinosaurs, including nine minutes of animatronics and six minutes of CGI animals. The film received critical acclaim for its innovations in CGI technology and animatronics. Among adults, the film generated an interest in dinosaurs, and it increased interest in the field of paleontology.

Winston and his team returned for the 1997 sequel, The Lost World: Jurassic Park, although the film relied more on CGI by ILM. The film features 75 computer-generated shots. While the first film showed that dinosaurs could be adequately recreated through special effects, the sequel raised the question of what could be done with the dinosaurs. Winston said, "I wanted to show the world what they didn't see in 'Jurassic Park': more dinosaurs and more dinosaur action. 'More, bigger, better' was our motto". Technology had not advanced much since the first film, although director Spielberg said that "the artistry of the creative computer people" had advanced: "There's better detail, much better lighting, better muscle tone and movement in the animals. When a dinosaur transfers weight from his left side to his right, the whole movement of fat and sinew is smoother, more physiologically correct". Besides animatronics, Winston's team also painted maquettes of dinosaurs that would subsequently be created through CGI.

Spielberg served as executive producer for each subsequent film. ILM and Winston returned for the 2001 film Jurassic Park III, directed by Joe Johnston. Winston's animatronics were more advanced than those used in previous films; they included the ability to blink, adding to the sense of realism. Animatronics were used for close-up shots. Winston's team took approximately 13 months to design and create the practical dinosaurs. The team also created dinosaur sculptures, which were then scanned by ILM to create the computer-generated versions of the animals.

Jurassic World trilogy (2015–2022) 
Winston planned to return for a fourth film, which was ultimately released in 2015 as Jurassic World. Winston, who had been planning more-advanced special effects for the project, died in 2008 before the start of filming. Legacy Effects, founded by former members of Stan Winston Studios, provided an animatronic dinosaur for Jurassic World. Otherwise, the film's creatures were largely created through CGI, provided by ILM and Image Engine. New technology, such as subsurface scattering, allowed for greater detail in the creatures' skin and muscle tissue. According to Jurassic World director Colin Trevorrow, the film's animals were created from scratch because "technology has changed so much that everything is a rebuild". Some of the computer-generated creatures were created with motion capture, using human actors to perform the animals' movements. Jurassic World was the first dinosaur film to use motion capture technology.

ILM returned for the 2018 sequel, Jurassic World: Fallen Kingdom, which featured animatronics by special-effects artist Neal Scanlan. The film features more dinosaurs than any previous film, including several new ones not seen in earlier films. Jurassic World: Fallen Kingdom also features more animatronic dinosaurs than any previous sequel, and the animatronics used were more advanced than in previous films. Fallen Kingdom director J.A. Bayona said animatronics "are very helpful on set, especially for the actors so they have something to perform against. There's an extra excitement if they can act in front of something real".

Five animatronic dinosaurs were created for Fallen Kingdom, which features close interaction between humans and dinosaurs. Scanlan and his team of 35 people spent more than eight months working on the dinosaurs. Scanlan said animatronics were not best for every scene: "In some ways it will have an impact on your shooting schedule; you have to take time to film with an animatronic. In the balance, we ask ourselves if it is economically and artistically more valuable to do it that way, or as a post-production effect". Unlike the previous film, ILM determined that motion capture technology would not be adequate for depicting the film's dinosaurs.

The 2019 Jurassic World short film, Battle at Big Rock, utilized CGI and reference maquettes by ILM, and an animatronic by Legacy Effects.

The 2022 film Jurassic World Dominion used more animatronics than the previous Jurassic World films. Approximately 18 animatronics of varying sizes were created for the film, by designer John Nolan. In a departure from previous films, the dinosaurs were made of recyclable materials. ILM created 900 CGI dinosaur shots for the film, and also produced various CGI dinosaurs for the film's five-minute prologue, released in 2021.

Scientific accuracy

Premise 
The franchise's premise involves the cloning of dinosaurs through ancient DNA, extracted from mosquitoes that sucked the blood of such animals and were then fossilized in amber, preserving the DNA. Later research showed that this would not be possible due to the degradation of DNA over time. The oldest DNA ever found only dated back approximately 1 million years, whereas dinosaurs died 66 million years ago. It is also unlikely that dinosaur DNA would survive a mosquito's digestive process, and fragments of DNA would not be nearly enough to recreate a dinosaur. In addition, the type of mosquito used in the first film, Toxorhynchites rutilus, does not actually suck blood.

The premise presents other issues as well. Michael Crichton's 1990 novel Jurassic Park and its film adaptation both explain that gene sequence gaps were filled in with frog DNA, although this would not result in a true dinosaur, as frogs and dinosaurs are not genetically similar. Furthermore, the novel uses artificial eggs to grow the dinosaurs, while the film uses ostrich eggs, although neither would be suitable for development. In addition, dinosaurs would likely have trouble adapting to the modern world, in part because of different oxygen levels.

At the time of the first film's release, Spielberg said he considered the premise to be "science eventuality" rather than science fiction, although Crichton disagreed: "It never crossed my mind that it was possible. From the first moment of publication, I was astonished by the degree to which it was taken seriously in scientific circles". Microbiologists at the time considered the premise to be implausible. The film's dinosaur consultant, paleontologist Jack Horner, later said: "Even if we had dinosaur DNA, we don't know how to actually form an animal just from DNA. The animal cloning that we do these days is with a live cell. We don't have any dinosaur live cells. The whole business of having a dinosaur is a lot of fiction". Horner has instead proposed that a "Chickenosaurus" may be possible, by altering a chicken's DNA.

Dinosaurs 
In creating Jurassic Park, Spielberg wanted to accurately portray the dinosaurs, and Horner was hired to ensure such accuracy. Tippett, a dinosaur enthusiast, also helped to keep the dinosaur portrayals realistic. The film followed the theory that dinosaurs had evolved into birds, and it was praised for its modern portrayal of dinosaurs, although Horner said that there were still many inaccuracies. However, he noted that the film is not a documentary and said he was "happy with having some fiction thrown in", stating: "My job was to get a little science into Jurassic Park, but not ruin it". Spielberg sought to portray the dinosaurs as animals rather than monsters, which changed the public perception of dinosaurs, although the sequels would have a deeper focus on rampaging dinosaurs. Horner said that in reality, "visiting a dinosaur park would be like going to a wild animal park. As long as you keep your windows rolled up, nobody's going to bother you. But that doesn't make a very good movie".

Horner was involved throughout the production process. His consulting work included the supervision of the CGI dinosaurs, ensuring that they were life-like and scientifically accurate. Horner and Spielberg would discuss ways to combine scientific facts with fictional elements, the latter being for entertainment purposes. Horner said "if I could demonstrate that something was true or not true, then he would go with that, but if I had some question about it and we didn't really have much evidence about it, he would go with whatever he thought would make the best movie". Horner returned as a paleontological consultant for the next four films. For The Lost World: Jurassic Park, Spielberg largely followed Horner's advice regarding dinosaur accuracy, but some exceptions were made. Winston's team closely modelled the dinosaurs based on paleontological facts, or theories in certain cases where facts were not definitively known. In Jurassic Park III, the character Dr. Alan Grant, a paleontologist, states that the resurrected dinosaurs are not authentic but rather are "genetically engineered theme park monsters". The film introduces a Velociraptor design featuring quills along the head. Aside from this, feathered dinosaurs have largely been absent from the series.

Before the release of Jurassic World, new research had shown that real dinosaurs were more colorful than they were in the films. Horner said that Spielberg "has made the point several times to me that colorful dinosaurs are not very scary. Gray and brown and black are more scary". Horner considered the colors to be the most inaccurate aspect of the films' dinosaurs. In addition, the dinosaurs are often depicting roaring, although paleontologists find this speculative or unrealistic. Horner said: "Dinosaurs gave rise to birds, and birds sing. I think most of the dinosaurs actually sang rather than growled".

Despite new dinosaur discoveries, the sequels largely kept the earlier dinosaur designs for continuity with the previous films. Paleontologists were disappointed with the outdated dinosaur portrayals in Jurassic World, including the lack of feathered dinosaurs, although they acknowledged that it is a work of fiction. Trevorrow said that Jurassic World was not meant as a documentary film, but as a sci-fi film. The film itself includes a scene stating that any inaccuracies in the dinosaurs can be attributed to the fact that they are genetically engineered animals. Trevorrow noted that the dinosaurs in the franchise – going back to Crichton's novels Jurassic Park and The Lost World (1995) – were partially recreated with frog DNA, stating "those weren't 'real' dinosaurs, any of them". Tim Alexander, visual effects supervisor for ILM, said that colorful dinosaurs were excluded because they would look out of place in the film: "It's very forest greens and taupes and park rangers. And if we then throw a bright pink raptor in there, it's going to stick out and look a little weird".

For Jurassic World: Fallen Kingdom, ILM consulted with paleontologists and did extensive research to accurately depict the dinosaurs. Dinosaur expert John Hankla, of the Denver Museum of Nature and Science, served as an advisor on the film, and also provided several dinosaur fossil recreations for the film. Horner said that his own involvement on Fallen Kingdom was minimal. Horner was consulted again for Jurassic World Dominion, and paleontologist Steve Brusatte was also hired as a science consultant. Fully feathered dinosaurs are introduced in Jurassic World Dominion and its prologue.

Table of appearances

List of creatures 
The following list includes on-screen appearances. Some animals listed here have also made prior appearances in the novels.

Ankylosaurus 
Ankylosaurus first appears in Jurassic Park III, through brief appearances. It was created by ILM entirely through CGI.

Ankylosaurus also appears in Jurassic World, as Trevorrow considered the dinosaur to be among his favorites. It is one of several creatures that Trevorrow felt was deserving of a substantial scene. In the film, an Ankylosaurus is killed by the Indominus rex. Trevorrow stated that the dinosaur's death was an example of moments in the film "that are designed to really make these creatures feel like living animals that you can connect to. Especially since so many of the themes in the film involve our relationship with animals on the planet right now, I wanted them to feel real".

In Jurassic World: Fallen Kingdom, several Ankylosaurus flee from a volcanic eruption and at least one is captured by mercenaries. It is later auctioned off to a wealthy Indonesian. Several Ankylosaurus escaped the Lockwood Manor Estate grounds alongside the other dinosaurs.

Apatosaurus 
In the novel Jurassic Park, Apatosaurus is the first group of dinosaurs seen on the island. It is replaced by Brachiosaurus in the film adaptation. Apatosaurus also appears in the sequel novel The Lost World, but is absent from its film adaptation.

Apatosaurus makes its first film appearance in Jurassic World, with several individuals being featured, including one depicted by an animatronic. Unlike earlier films which featured numerous animatronics, the Apatosaurus was the only one created for Jurassic World. Producer Patrick Crowley was initially hesitant to have an animatronic built because of the high cost, but Trevorrow persuaded him that fans of the series would enjoy it. The animatronic, built by Legacy Effects, consisted of a -long section of the dinosaur's neck and head. It was used for a close-up shot depicting the animal's death, after it had been injured in a dinosaur attack. Audio recordings of a Harris's hawk were used for the moans of the wounded Apatosaurus.

To animate the Apatosaurus, ILM used elephants as an example. Glen McIntosh, the animation supervisor for ILM, stated that "there are no existing animals that have such large necks, but in terms of the size and steps they're taking, elephants are an excellent example of that. Also the way their skin jiggles and sags. You also have impact tremors that rise up through their legs as they take steps". Originally, Legacy Effects only created a small model of the Apatosaurus for use in the film, but executive producer Steven Spielberg decided that a larger model would be better. The original model was scanned into a computer, allowing artists to create a larger 3-D model needed for the film. Apatosaurus makes appearances in the subsequent Jurassic World films.

Brachiosaurus 
In the first Jurassic Park film, a Brachiosaurus is the first dinosaur seen by the park's visitors. The scene was described by Empire as the 28th most magical moment in cinema. A later scene depicts characters in a high tree, interacting with a Brachiosaurus. This scene required the construction of a -tall puppet that represented the animal's upper neck and head. The film inaccurately depicts the species as having the ability to stand on its hind legs, allowing it to reach high tree branches. The dinosaur is also inaccurately depicted as chewing its food, an idea that was added to make it seem docile like a cow. Whale songs and donkey calls were used for the Brachiosaurus sounds, although scientific evidence showed that the real animal had limited vocal abilities. Brachiosaurus appears again in Jurassic Park III, created by ILM entirely through CGI.

Brachiosaurus returns in Jurassic World: Fallen Kingdom, including a scene in which one individual is stranded on Isla Nublar and dies in a volcanic eruption. Director J. A. Bayona stated that this Brachiosaurus is meant to be the same one that is first seen in the original Jurassic Park. For Fallen Kingdom, the Brachiosaurus was created using the same animations from the first film. The Brachiosaurus death was the last shot on the film to be finished. Bayona and the post-production team struggled to perfect the CGI, with only several days left to complete the scene. They worked through the final night to perfect the colors and composition, shortly before the film's release. Fans and film critics considered the dinosaur's death scene sad. Reviewers described its death as "poignant" or "haunting", particularly given the species' role in the first film.

Compsognathus 
Procompsognathus appears in the novels, but is replaced by Compsognathus in the film series.

Their first film appearance is in The Lost World: Jurassic Park. In the film, the character Dr. Robert Burke, a paleontologist, identifies the dinosaur as Compsognathus triassicus, which in reality is a non-existent species; the film combined the names of Compsognathus longipes and Procompsognathus triassicus. In the film, Compsognathus are depicted as small carnivorous theropods which attack in packs.

The Compsognathus were nicknamed "Compies" by Winston's crew. Dennis Muren, the film's visual effects supervisor, considered Compsognathus the most complex digital dinosaur. Because of their small size, the Compies had their entire body visible onscreen and thus needed a higher sense of gravity and weight. A simple puppet of the Compsognathus was used in the film's opening scene, in which the dinosaurs attack a little girl. Later in the film, they kill the character Dieter Stark, who is played by Peter Stormare. For Stark's death scene, Stormare had to wear a jacket with numerous rubber Compies attached.

Compsognathus make brief appearances in all subsequent films, with the exception of Jurassic World. In the novels, Procompsognathus is depicted with the fictitious feature of a venomous bite, although such a trait is not mentioned regarding their onscreen counterparts. Compsognathus returns in the 2022 film Jurassic World Dominion.

Dilophosaurus 
A fictionalized version of Dilophosaurus appears in the first novel and its film adaptation, both depicting it with the ability to spit venom. The film's Dilophosaurus also has a fictionalized neck frill that retracts, and the dinosaur was made significantly smaller to ensure that audiences would not confuse it with the velociraptors. In addition to the animatronic, a set of legs was also created for a shot in which the dinosaur hops across the screen. The Dilophosaurus scene was shot on a sound stage, and the animal's lower body portion was suspended from a catwalk with bungee cords. No CGI was used in creating the Dilophosaurus.

In both the novel and its film adaptation, a Dilophosaurus uses its venom on the character Dennis Nedry before killing him. The animatronic model was nicknamed "Spitter" by Winston's team. A paintball mechanism was used to spit the venom, which was a mixture of methyl cellulose, K-Y Jelly, and purple food coloring. The film's idea of a neck frill came from a suggestion by concept artist John Gurche. The animatronic was made to support three interchangeable heads, depending on the position of the frill. The dinosaur's vocal sounds are a combination of a swan, a hawk, a howler monkey, and a rattlesnake.

Spielberg initially believed that the Dilophosaurus would be the easiest dinosaur to film, although the scene proved harder to shoot that he had expected. The scene is set during a storm, and the use of water to simulate the rain resulted in complications for the animal's puppeteer. A shot not included in the final film would have shown inflatable venom sacs, located under the animal's mouth. These would become visible as the dinosaur spits its venom, which would be expelled from the animatronic's mouth using compressed air. However, the atmosphere was cold and humid on-set, and the compressed air became visible under these conditions. Spielberg resolved the issue by cutting the scene to Nedry as the venom hits him, rather than showing it exiting the animal's mouth.

Dilophosaurus was popularized by its film appearance in Jurassic Park, but is considered the most fictionalized dinosaur in the film. Horner, in 2013, described Dilophosaurus as a good dinosaur to "make a fictional character out of, because I think two specimens are known, and both of them are really crappy. They're not preserved very well". Paleontologist Scott Persons later said that the Dilophosaurus is the most controversial dinosaur depiction in the film series.

In Jurassic World, a Dilophosaurus appears as a hologram in the theme park's visitor center. The dinosaur's venom is also referenced in a comedic tour video featured in the film, in which tour guide Jimmy Fallon is paralyzed by the venom.

A living Dilophosaurus was intended to appear in Jurassic World: Fallen Kingdom, but the scene was never filmed, as director Bayona decided that it was not necessary. The scene, set on board the Arcadia ship, would depict the characters Owen and Claire encountering a Dilophosaurus in a cage. Bayona believed that the Arcadia scenes were long enough already. Dilophosaurus appears in Jurassic World: Fallen Kingdom only as a diorama, on display at Benjamin Lockwood's estate.

Several Dilophosaurus individuals appear in Jurassic World Dominion, which marks the first living appearance since the original film. One individual has an encounter with Claire, and a trio of the animals later kill Lewis Dodgson, mirroring Nedry's death from the original. Like the first film, no CGI was used to create the Dilophosaurus, the only animal on the film to lack a digital model. Instead, it was depicted with an animatronic controlled by 12 puppeteers. As with the original film, methyl cellulose was used to create the venom, which was shot out by an off-screen technician.

Dimorphodon 
Dimorphodon, a type of pterosaur, appears in Jurassic World, marking its first appearance in the series. In the film, the species launch an attack on tourists after being released from an aviary. Through motion capture, dwarf actor Martin Klebba stood in as a Dimorphodon during a scene in which one of the creatures tries to attack Owen. A full-scale Dimorphodon head was also created. The sound of baby brown pelicans were used as the vocal effects for the Dimorphodon.

Gallimimus 
A group of running Gallimimus is featured in the first film, and is encountered by the character of Dr. Alan Grant along with Lex and Tim. The Gallimimus were created by ILM entirely through CGI. It was the first dinosaur to be digitized. The Gallimimus design was based on ostriches, and the animators also referred to footage of herding gazelles. In the ILM parking lot, animators were filmed running around to provide reference for the dinosaurs' run, with plastic pipes standing in for a fallen tree that the Gallimimus jump over. One of the animators fell while trying to make the jump, and this inspired the incorporation of a Gallimimus also falling. A portion of the scene depicts a Tyrannosaurus killing a Gallimimus, which was inspired by a scene in The Valley of Gwangi. Horse squeals were used to provide the Gallimimus vocal sounds.

Gallimimus returns in Jurassic World, in which a running herd is depicted during a tour. The scene is a reference to the dinosaur's appearance in the first film. This new Gallimimus scene was created by Image Engine. The company's artists often viewed the species' appearance in the first film for reference. Jeremy Mesana, the animation supervisor for Imagine Engine, said: "We were always going back and staring at that little snippet from the first film. It was always interesting trying to find the feeling of the Gallimimus. Trying to capture the same essence of that original shot was really tricky". By the time Jurassic World was created, scientists had found that Gallimimus had feathers, although this trait is absent from the film.

Giganotosaurus 
Giganotosaurus is introduced in the 2021 Jurassic World Dominion prologue. It serves as the dinosaur antagonist in the prologue and the film itself. Trevorrow saved the Giganotosaurus for the third Jurassic World film to set up a rivalry between it and the T. rex. In the prologue, a Giganotosaurus kills a T. rex in battle during the Cretaceous, and two cloned versions face off in the subsequent film, set during the present day. The film presents Giganotosaurus as the largest carnivore to have ever existed on Earth, although in reality, the Spinosaurus is believed to have been bigger. In the film's climactic scene, the Giganotosaurus is killed when the Tyrannosaurus rex throws the Giganotosaurus onto the claws of a Therizinosaurus.

Giganotosaurus was originally meant to be a CGI-only animal, though Trevorrow later decided to have a practical version created as well, to enhance the actors' performances. Animatronic creator John Nolan said the Giganotosaurus was "probably the biggest challenge" for his team. The dinosaur was expected to take six months to build, but his team only had about four months to finish it. An animatronic head and neck – the size of a car – were built by Nolan's team, while ILM depicted the rest of the animal through CGI. Nolan initially used a 3D printer to create a one-tenth scale head, on which the animatronic was based. Nolan's team used polystyrene and latex to craft the Giganotosaurus. The creature was operated on a rig measuring approximately 65 feet in length, and it took six hours to relocate the animal from one set to another.

Speaking about the Giganotosaurus, Trevorrow said, "I wanted something that felt like the Joker. It just wants to watch the world burn". At Trevorrow's request, Nolan added battle scars on the animal's face, similar to Jack Nicholson's Joker character in the 1989 film Batman. The Joker influence also extended to the dinosaur's lumbering movements.

Indominus rex 
Indominus rex is a fictional dinosaur antagonist in Jurassic World. It is a genetically modified hybrid dinosaur, made up of DNA from various animals. It is created by the character Dr. Henry Wu to boost theme-park attendance, although it later escapes. In the film, it is stated that the dinosaur's base genome is a T. rex, and that it also has the DNA of a Velociraptor, a cuttlefish, and a tree frog. The film's promotional website states that the creature also has the DNA of a Carnotaurus, a Giganotosaurus, a Majungasaurus, and a Rugops. Trevorrow said the mixed DNA allowed the animal to have attributes "that no dinosaur was known to have".

The Indominus is shown white in color, and can sense thermal radiation. It can also camouflage itself thanks to its cuttlefish DNA, and it uses this ability to evade capture. Carnotaurus was previously depicted in Crichton's novel The Lost World with the same ability to camouflage. Other characteristics of the Indominus include its long arms, raptor claws, and small thumbs. It is able to walk on four legs. ILM's animation supervisor, Glen McIntosh, said: "The goal was to always make sure she felt like a gigantic animal that was a theropod but taking advantage of its extra features". Therizinosaurus inspired the long forelimbs of the Indominus. Horner rejected an early idea that the dinosaur could be depicted as bulletproof, but he otherwise told Trevorrow to add any attributes that he wanted the animal to have. Trevorrow and Horner began with a list of possible characteristics and then gradually narrowed it down. Trevorrow said: "These kind of things were often decided by the needs of the narrative. If it was going to pick up a guy and bite his head off, it was going to need thumbs". Trevorrow wanted the Indominus to look like it could be an actual dinosaur, while Horner was disappointed that the dinosaur did not look more extreme, saying that he "wanted something that looked really different".

In an earlier draft of the script, the film's dinosaur antagonist was depicted as a real animal despite being a non-existent species in reality. Trevorrow chose to make the antagonist a genetically modified hybrid dinosaur named Indominus rex, maintaining consistency with earlier films which had generally incorporated the latest paleontological discoveries. He said, "I didn't wanna make up a new dinosaur and tell kids it was real". Fans were initially concerned upon learning that the film would feature a hybrid dinosaur, but Trevorrow said that the concept was "not tremendously different" from dinosaurs in earlier films, in which the animals were partially recreated with frog DNA. He described a hybrid dinosaur as "the next level", and said "we aren't doing anything here that Crichton didn't suggest in his novels". Horner considered the concept of transgenic dinosaurs to be the most realistic aspect of the film, saying it was "more plausible than bringing a dinosaur back from amber". However, a hybridized dinosaur made of various animals' DNA would still be exceedingly difficult to create, due to the complexity of altering the genomes.

Trevorrow said the behavior of the Indominus was partially inspired by the 2013 film Blackfish, saying that the dinosaur "is kind of out killing for sport because it grew up in captivity. It's sort of, like, if the black fish orca got loose and never knew its mother and has been fed from a crane". In the film, it is stated that there were initially two Indominus individuals, and that one cannibalized its sibling. Fifth scale maquettes of the Indominus rex were created for lighting reference. Motion capture was initially considered for portraying the Indominus, although Trevorrow felt that the method did not work well for the dinosaur. The animal sounds used to create the Indominus roars included those from big pigs, whales, beluga whales, dolphins, a fennec fox, lions, monkeys, and walruses.

The name Indominus rex is derived from the Latin words indomitus meaning "fierce" or "untameable" and rex meaning "king". The creature is sometimes referred to as the I. rex for short, although producer Frank Marshall stated that the film crew abbreviated the name as simply Indominus. Among the public, the Indominus rex was occasionally known during production as Diabolus rex, a name that Trevorrow made up to maintain secrecy on the film prior to its release.

In the film, the character Hoskins proposes making miniature versions of the Indominus as military weapons. The Indominus rex is later killed during a battle with a T. rex, a Velociraptor, and a Mosasaurus. In the sequel, Jurassic World: Fallen Kingdom, DNA is retrieved from a fragment of the Indominus rex skeleton and is used alongside Velociraptor DNA to create the Indoraptor. The bone sample is later destroyed by the T. rex following the death of Eli Mills.

Indoraptor 
Indoraptor is a fictional hybrid dinosaur antagonist in Jurassic World: Fallen Kingdom. It is made by combining the DNA from the Indominus rex and a Velociraptor. In the film, it is created by Dr. Henry Wu on behalf of Eli Mills as a weaponized animal. The creature escapes at Benjamin Lockwood's estate and kills several people, before battling Blue, a Velociraptor. The Indoraptor eventually falls to its death when it is impaled on the horn of a ceratopsian skull, on display in Lockwood's library of dinosaur skeletons.

The Indoraptor has long human-like arms, which Spielberg considered to be the animal's scariest trait. The front teeth and long claws were inspired by Count Orlok in Nosferatu. Bayona chose black for the dinosaur's color to give the appearance of a black shadow, saying "it's very terrifying when you see the Indoraptor in the dark because you can only see the eyes and the teeth". Initially, the film was to feature two Indoraptors, one black and one white. The black Indoraptor would kill the white one, in what Bayona considered similar to Cain and Abel. The white Indoraptor was ultimately removed from the script as the story was considered detailed enough without it.

The Indoraptor was primarily created through CGI, although close-up shots used a practical head, neck, shoulders, foot and arm. Neal Scanlan provided the animatronics. An inflatable Indoraptor stand-in, operated by two puppeteers on set, was used for some scenes, with CGI replacing it later in production. David Vickery, ILM's visual effects supervisor, said that Bayona wanted the Indoraptor to look "malnourished and slightly unhinged". The Indoraptor vocal sounds were created by combining noises from various types of animal, including chihuahua, pig, cougar, and lion. The sound of dental drills was also used.

Bayona incorporated elements from the 1931 film Frankenstein as he wanted to give the Indoraptor the feel of a "rejected creature". Bayona said: "There's something of that in the way we introduce the character, the Indoraptor, this kind of laboratory in the underground facilities at the end of a long corridor, inside a cell. It has this kind of Gothic element that reminds me a little bit of the world of Frankenstein, this kind of Gothic world. And we have also references of people with mental illness, like this kind of shake you see from time to time. It's kind of like a nervous tic that the Indoraptor has, and it's taken from real references of mentally ill people".

The Indoraptor is the last hybrid dinosaur of the Jurassic World trilogy.

Mosasaurus 
Mosasaurus appears in Jurassic World, as the first aquatic reptile in the films. Earlier drafts for Jurassic Park III and Jurassic Park IV (later Jurassic World) had featured the aquatic reptile Kronosaurus. The Mosasaurus was suggested by Trevorrow, as part of a theme-park feeding show in which park-goers watch from bleachers as the animal leaps out of a lagoon and catches its prey: a shark hanging above the water. The park guests are then lowered in the bleacher seats for a view of the mosasaur's aquatic habitat.

The Mosasaurus was designed to resemble the dinosaurs designed by Winston for the earlier films. Trevorrow said: "We made sure to give her a look and a kind of personality in the way we designed her face that recalled Stan Winston's designs for many of the other dinosaurs in this world. She looks like a Jurassic Park dinosaur". Legacy Effects developed the original design for the Mosasaurus and ILM refined it. The animators referenced crocodiles for the creature's swimming pattern.

The Mosasaurus was originally designed as a -long animal, but Spielberg requested that it be enlarged after seeing the initial design. ILM was concerned about making the animal appear too large, but the team was advised by Horner that an increased length would fit within the realm of possibility, as larger aquatic reptiles were consistently being discovered. Some criticized the Mosasaurus for appearing to be twice the size of the largest known species. Horner said "the size of this one is a little out of proportion, but we don't know the ultimate size of any extinct animal". The film inaccurately depicts the Mosasaurus with scutes along its back, a trait that was based on outdated depictions of the creature. Audio recordings of a walrus and a beluga whale provided the Mosasaurus roars.

The Mosasaurus returns in Jurassic World: Fallen Kingdom, in the opening and ending sequences. Compared with the previous film, the Mosasaurus is depicted as being larger in Fallen Kingdom. ILM animation supervisor Glen McIntosh cited this as an example of how "we sometimes have to fudge reality to make something work. From shot to shot, the mosasaurus often changed size slightly to make best use of each frame composition". Although Mosasaurus was thought to have had a forked tongue, McIntosh said that the fictional animal was given a regular tongue to make it "more believable to most filmgoers", saying that "we'd played with its scale so much that we felt giving it a forked tongue would be too much".

For Jurassic World and its sequel, ILM referenced footage of breaching whales, which helped the team determine how to create realistic shots where the Mosasaurus leaps from the water. The Mosasaurus makes a brief return in the short film Battle at Big Rock, and in Jurassic World Dominion where she is seen sinking a fishing boat and later swimming with a pod of whales.

Pachycephalosaurus 
Pachycephalosaurus appears in The Lost World and its film adaptation. Three versions of the Pachycephalosaurus were created for filming: a full hydraulic puppet, a head, and a head-butter. The latter was built to withstand high impact for a scene in which the dinosaur head-butts one of the hunter vehicles using its domed skull. The puppet version was one of the most complex created for the film, and was used for a scene in which the dinosaur is captured. The legs of the puppet were controlled through pneumatics. Among the public, Pachycephalosaurus is the best-known member of the Pachycephalosauria clade, in part because of its appearance in The Lost World: Jurassic Park. Later research suggested that the animal's skull was not used for head-butting.

In Jurassic World, a Pachycephalosaurus briefly appears on a surveillance screen inside the park's control room.

Pteranodon 
Pteranodon, a pterosaur, makes a brief appearance at the end of The Lost World: Jurassic Park. Earlier drafts of the script had featured Pteranodon in a larger role, and Spielberg insisted to Jurassic Park III director Joe Johnston that he include the creature in the third film. Pteranodon is prominently featured in Jurassic Park III, although it is a fictionalization of the actual animal, and it has a different appearance to those seen in The Lost World: Jurassic Park. In the third film, a group of Pteranodons are kept in an aviary on Isla Sorna. The idea of a pterosaur aviary had originated in Crichton's original Jurassic Park novel. An earlier draft of the film had included a storyline about Pteranodons escaping to the Costa Rican mainland and killing people there.

The Pteranodons in Jurassic Park III were created through a combination of animatronics and puppetry. To create the flight movements, ILM animators studied footage of flying bats and birds, and also consulted a Pteranodon expert. Winston's team also designed and created five rod puppets to depict baby Pteranodons in a nest, with puppeteers working underneath the nest to control them. The third film ends with a shot of escaped Pteranodons flying away from the island. Johnston wanted an ending shot of "these creatures being beautiful and elegant". He denied, then later suggested, that the fleeing Pteranodons would be included in the plot for a fourth film. Promotional material for the Jurassic World films later explained that the escaped Pteranodons were killed off-screen after reaching Canada.

Another variation of Pteranodon is featured in Jurassic World, which also depicts them living in an aviary. They are later inadvertently freed by the Indominus rex and wreak havoc on the park's tourists. For Jurassic World, the Pteranodon vocal effects were created using audio recordings of a mother osprey, defending her chicks against another individual.

Pteranodons make an appearance in a post-credits scene for Jurassic World: Fallen Kingdom. The scene is set at the Paris Las Vegas resort, where escaped Pteranodons land atop the resort's Eiffel Tower.

A Pteranodon makes a brief appearance in the short film Battle at Big Rock, and several individuals appear in the Jurassic World Dominion prologue, as well as the main film.

The films depict Pteranodon with the ability to pick up humans using its feet, although the actual animal would not have been able to do this.

Pyroraptor 
Pyroraptor appears in Jurassic World Dominion, becoming one of the first fully feathered dinosaurs in the film series. Designer John Nolan created an animatronic model representing the head and neck, covered in real, red-colored feathers. Various research and efforts were dedicated to properly simulating feather movements. This included the use of wind machines, foam latex, and silicone. The animal is depicted swimming underwater at one point, and research went into various feathers to determine which looked best in such a scene. The feathers were dyed and hand woven onto a net which wrapped over the head, making the feathers move and react with the animatronic.

In another scene, the Pyroraptor jumps out of the water with its feathers soaked, presenting a challenge for CGI artists. According to David Vickery, ILM's visual effects supervisor, feather and water effects are very difficult to achieve digitally, and the two together presented "a perfect storm of technological complexity". To resolve this, ILM used the 3D software Houdini to adequately depict the feathers. Trevorrow considered Pyroraptor the most difficult dinosaur to create, due to the amount of work that went into its feathers.

Spinosaurus 

Spinosaurus is introduced in Jurassic Park III and appears throughout the film, which popularized the animal. After the two previous movies, the filmmakers wanted to replace the T. rex with a new dinosaur antagonist. Baryonyx was originally considered, before Horner convinced the filmmakers to go with his favorite carnivorous dinosaur: Spinosaurus, an animal larger than the T. rex. Spinosaurus had a distinctive sail on its back; Johnston said: "A lot of dinosaurs have a very similar silhouette to the T-Rex ... and we wanted the audience to instantly recognize this as something else".

Winston's team created the Spinosaurus over a 10-month period, beginning with a 1/16 maquette version. This was followed by a 1/5 scale version with more detail, and eventually the full-scale version. The Spinosaurus animatronic was built from the knees up, while full body shots were created through CGI. The animatronic measured 44 feet long, weighed 13 tons, and was faster and more powerful than the 9-ton T. rex. Winston and his team had to remove a wall to get the Spinosaurus animatronic out of his studio. It was then transported by flatbed truck to the Universal Studios Lot, where a sound stage had to be designed specifically to accommodate the large dinosaur. The Spinosaurus was placed on a track that allowed the creature to be moved backward and forward for filming. Four Winston technicians were required to fully operate the animatronic. It had 1,000 horsepower, compared to the T. rex which operated at 300 horsepower. Johnston said: "It's like the difference between a family station wagon and a Ferrari". For a scene in which the Spinosaurus stomps on a crashed airplane, Winston's team created a full-scale Spinosaurus leg prop, controlled by puppeteers. The leg, suspended in the air by two poles, was slammed down into a plane fuselage prop for a series of shots.

The film's Spinosaurus was based on limited records suggesting what the actual animal had looked like. A scene in the film depicts the Spinosaurus swimming, an ability that the real animal was believed to have possessed at the time. Later research proved this theory, suggesting that the animal was primarily an aquatic dinosaur, whereas the film version was depicted largely as a land animal. The roars of the Spinosaurus in the film were created by mixing the low guttural sounds of a lion and an alligator, a bear cub crying, and a lengthened cry of a large bird that gave the roars a raspy quality.

In Jurassic Park III, the Spinosaurus kills a T. rex during battle. Some fans of the Jurassic Park series were upset with the decision to kill the T. rex and replace it. Horner later said that the dinosaur would not have won against a T. rex, believing it was likely that Spinosaurus only ate fish. An early script featured a death sequence for the Spinosaurus near the end of the film, as the character Alan Grant would use a Velociraptor resonating chamber to call a pack of raptors which would attack and kill it.

A skeleton of Spinosaurus is featured in Jurassic World, on display in the theme park. The skeleton is later destroyed when a T. rex is set free and smashes through it, meant as revenge for the earlier scene in Jurassic Park III.

A Spinosaurus appears in the fourth season of the animated television series Jurassic World Camp Cretaceous, which premiered in December 2021. The dinosaur serves as one of several threats to the main characters. Executive producer Scott Kreamer suggested it is the same Spinosaurus featured in Jurassic Park III. Fellow executive producer Colin Trevorrow, when asked if it is the same one, responded "My instinct is actually, no, because it sounds different, but I'm a nerd. So what I don't want to do is mess it up for everyone making Camp Cretaceous. I'm going to screw this up for them. I found it to be a slightly different animal, like on sight and on sound". The Spinosaurus returns in the show's fifth season and eventually engages in battle with a T. rex, providing fans a long-awaited rematch between the two animals. The Spinosaurus retreats when a second T. rex approaches.

Stegoceratops 
Stegoceratops is a hybrid dinosaur made from the DNA of a Stegosaurus and a Triceratops. It makes only a brief appearance near the end of Jurassic World, when an image of the dinosaur is visible on a computer screen in Dr. Henry Wu's laboratory. An early draft of the film had a scene where Owen and Claire came across the Stegoceratops in the jungle on Isla Nublar. The Stegoceratops would have joined the Indominus rex as a second hybrid dinosaur. However, Trevorrow decided to remove the animal from the final script after his son convinced him that having multiple hybrids would make the Indominus less unique.

Although the dinosaur is largely removed from the film, a toy version was still released by Hasbro, which produced a toyline based on Jurassic World. Trevorrow, discussing his decision to remove the Stegoceratops, said: "The idea that there was more than one made it feel less like the one synthetic among all the other organics, and suddenly it seemed entirely wrong to have it in the movie. I suddenly hated the idea but the toy still exists as a kind of remnant because Hasbro toys are locked a year out". The dinosaur also appears in the video games Jurassic World: The Game (2015), Jurassic World Alive (2018) and Jurassic World Evolution (2018).

Stegosaurus 
Stegosaurus appears in the Jurassic Park novel but was replaced by Triceratops for the film adaptation. The dinosaur's name (misspelled as "Stegasaurus") is seen on an embryo cooler label in the film, but the animal is otherwise absent. Stegosaurus instead made its film debut in The Lost World: Jurassic Park, after writer David Koepp took a suggestion from a child's letter to include the dinosaur. According to Spielberg, Stegosaurus was included due to "popular demand". In the film, a group of adult Stegosaurus attack Dr. Sarah Harding when they spot her taking pictures of their baby, believing that she is trying to harm it. Stegosaurus is among other dinosaurs that are captured later in the film.

Full-sized versions of an adult and infant Stegosaurus were built by Winston's team, although Spielberg later opted for a digital version of the adults, so they could be more mobile. The adults were not used due to mobility issues and safety concerns. Winston's adult Stegosaurus is only shown in a brief shot, in which the animal is caged.

Stegosaurus has appeared briefly in each film since then. For Jurassic World, ILM studied the movements of rhinos and elephants, and copied their movements when animating the Stegosaurus. The film inaccurately depicts Stegosaurus dragging its tail near the ground, unlike previous films.

The animal makes a brief return in the short film Battle at Big Rock.

Stygimoloch 
Stygimoloch is introduced in Jurassic World: Fallen Kingdom, and was included for comic relief. Its vocal sounds were a combination of dachshund, camel, and pig noises. Sound designer Al Nelson said: "It created this sweet, gurgling kind of thing that fits perfectly with this funny little creature". Horner was surprised by the inclusion of Stygimoloch, whose existence was considered doubtful by him and other paleontologists; they believed the animal to actually be a juvenile form of Pachycephalosaurus rather than a separate dinosaur. Like Pachycephalosaurus, the Stygimoloch had a domed skull, which it uses in the film to smash through a brick wall.

For its return in Dominion, animatronic designer John Nolan studied modern animals which also headbutt. This inspired a scene in which the Stygimoloch is captive in an anti-ramming cage; the animal's front half was constructed and visible, while a puppeteer performed its thrashing movements from behind.

Therizinosaurus 
Therizinosaurus is introduced in Jurassic World Dominion, becoming one of first fully feathered dinosaurs to appear in the film series. Trevorrow was initially excited to include the animal, but had second thoughts upon learning that it was an herbivore. Co-writer Emily Carmichael said that "the rest of us were like, 'It might still have its territory threatened. It might still be formidable and dangerous. Just because it's vegetarian doesn't mean it's a pushover!'" Being an herbivore, Trevorrow considered it challenging to present the Therizinosaurus as a scary animal. The filmmakers relied on paleontological discoveries for the animal's design, but also sought to have it resemble Winston's dinosaur animatronics.

Triceratops 
Triceratops makes an appearance in the first film as a sick dinosaur, taking the place of the novel's Stegosaurus. Triceratops was a childhood-favorite of Spielberg's. The Triceratops was portrayed through an animatronic created by Winston's team. Winston was caught off-guard when Spielberg decided to shoot the Triceratops scene sooner than expected. It took eight puppeteers to operate the animatronic. The Triceratops would end up being the first dinosaur filmed during production. Aside from the adult  Triceratops, a baby had also been created for the character of Lex to ride around on, but this scene was cut to improve the film's pacing. To create the Triceratops vocals, sound designer Gary Rydstrom breathed into a cardboard tube and combined the sound with that of cows near his workplace at Skywalker Ranch.

Triceratops makes brief appearances in each of the subsequent films. In The Lost World: Jurassic Park, a baby Triceratops was created by Winston's team for a shot depicting the animal in a cage. For its appearance in Jurassic World, the ILM animators studied rhinos and elephants, as they did with the Stegosaurus. In the film, Triceratops is depicted galloping, although the real animal was sluggish and would not have been able to do so.

An adult and baby Triceratops appear in Jurassic World: Fallen Kingdom.

Tyrannosaurus rex

Rexy 

Tyrannosaurus rex is the primary dinosaur featured in the novels and throughout the film series. The same T. rex individual appears throughout the Jurassic World trilogy, and has since become commonly known as "Rexy" among fans.

Others 
A Tyrannosaurus family is featured in The Lost World: Jurassic Park. The original T. rex animatronic from the first film was reused for the sequel, and Winston's team also built a second adult. The animatronics were built from head to mid-body, while full body shots were created through CGI. The animatronics weighed nine tons each and cost $1 million apiece.

Michael Lantieri, the film's special effects supervisor, said, "The big T. rex robot can pull two Gs of force when it's moving from right to left. If you hit someone with that, you'd kill them. So, in a sense, we did treat the dinosaurs as living, dangerous creatures". The animatronics were used for a scene in which the dinosaurs smash their heads against a trailer, causing authentic damage to the vehicle rather than using computer effects. As part of this sequence, an 80-foot track was built into the sound stage floor, allowing the T. rexes to be moved backward and forward.

The T. rexes could not be moved from their location on the sound stage, so new sets had to be built around the animatronics as filming progressed. Animatronics were primarily used for a scene in which the T. rexes kill the character Eddie, with the exception of two CGI shots: when the animals emerge from the forest and when they tear Eddie's body in half. Otherwise, animatronics were used for shots in which the animals tear the vehicle apart to get to Eddie. Filming the scene with the animatronics required close collaboration with a stunt coordinator. An animatronic T. rex was also used in scenes depicting the deaths of Dr. Robert Burke and Peter Ludlow.

As in the novel The Lost World, a baby T. rex is also depicted in the film adaptation, through two different practical versions, including a remote-controlled version for the actors to carry. A second, hybrid version was operated by hydraulics and cables; this version was used during a scene in which the dinosaur lies on an operating table while a cast is set on its broken leg. Weeks before filming began, Spielberg decided to change the ending to have an adult T. rex rampage through San Diego looking for its baby, saying, "We've gotta do it. It's too fun not to".

A T. rex appears only briefly in Jurassic Park III, which instead uses Spinosaurus as its primary dinosaur antagonist. In the film, a T. rex is killed in a battle against a Spinosaurus.

Velociraptor 

Velociraptor is depicted in the franchise as an intelligent pack hunter. It has major roles in the novels and the films, both of which depict it as being bigger than its real-life counterpart. The franchise's Velociraptors are actually based on the Deinonychus, but are larger than the latter. In writing Jurassic Park, Crichton was partly inspired by Gregory S. Paul's 1988 book Predatory Dinosaurs of the World, which mislabeled Deinonychus as a Velociraptor species.

John Ostrom, who discovered Deinonychus, was also consulted by Crichton for the novel, and later by Spielberg for the film adaptation. Ostrom said that Crichton based the novel's Velociraptors on Deinonychus in "almost every detail", but ultimately chose the name Velociraptor because he thought it sounded more dramatic. The Utahraptor, however, was a more accurate dinosaur in size, length, and height comparison to the franchise's Velociraptors; it was discovered shortly before the 1993 release of Jurassic Parks film adaptation. Winston joked: "After we created it, they discovered it". Like their fictional counterparts, real raptors are believed to have been intelligent and may have been pack hunters.

In the first film, the raptors were created through a combination of animatronics and CGI. A fully functioning raptor head took four months to create. The creature was also depicted by men in suits for certain scenes, including the death of character Robert Muldoon, who is mauled by one. John Rosengrant, a member of Winston's team, had to bend over to fit inside the raptor suit for a scene set in a restaurant kitchen. Filming lasted up to four hours at a time; Rosengrant said: "My back would go out after about 30 minutes, and that was after having trained a couple of hours a day for weeks". Part of the kitchen scene was initially going to depict the raptors with forked tongues, like snakes. Horner objected to this, saying it would have been scientifically inaccurate, in part because it would imply a link with cold-blooded reptiles. Instead, Spielberg opted to feature a raptor snorting onto a kitchen-door window, fogging it up. This would keep with the idea that dinosaurs were warm-blooded. The various raptor vocals were created by combining the sounds of dolphin screams, walruses bellowing, geese hissing, an African crane's mating call, tortoises mating, and human rasps.

Velociraptor has appeared in each subsequent film. In The Lost World: Jurassic Park, a mechanical version of the raptor was created to depict the animal's upper body. A full-motion raptor was also created through CGI. In addition to the regular raptors, a "super-raptor" had also been considered for inclusion in the film, but Spielberg rejected it, saying it was "a little too much out of a horror film. I didn't want to create an alien".

In the first film, Muldoon states that the raptors are extremely intelligent. Jurassic Park III depicts them as being smarter than previously realized, with the ability to communicate among each other through their resonating chambers. This was inspired by the theory that other dinosaurs, such as Parasaurolophus, were capable of sophisticated communication. Johnston said "it's not completely outlandish that a raptor using soft tissue in its nasal area could produce some kind of sound and communicate in much the same way that birds do. There's all kinds of evidence of lots of different species of animals communicating. So, I don't think we were breaking any rules there or creating something that was scientifically impossible". The new raptor vocals were created from bird sounds. Velociraptor animatronics were used for Jurassic Park III, and a partial raptor suit was also made for a scene depicting the death of Udesky. Before the release of Jurassic Park III, most paleontologists theorized that Velociraptor had feathers like modern birds. For the third film, the appearance of the male raptors was updated to depict them with a row of small quills on their heads and necks, as suggested by Horner.

Paleontologist Robert T. Bakker, who was an early pioneer of the dinosaur-bird connection, said in 2004 that the feather quills in Jurassic Park III "looked like a roadrunner's toupee", although he noted that feathers were difficult to animate. He speculated that the raptors in the upcoming Jurassic Park IV would have more realistic plumage. Jurassic Park IV, ultimately released as Jurassic World, does not feature feathered Velociraptors, maintaining consistency with earlier films. Horner said "we knew Velociraptor should have feathers and be more colorful, but we couldn't really change that look because everything goes back to the first movie". Velociraptor is also depicted holding its front limbs in an outdated manner, not supported by scientific findings. Research has also found that the real animal lacked the flexible tails and snarling facial expressions that are depicted in the film.

Jurassic World trilogy and Blue 

At Spielberg's suggestion, the fourth film includes a plot about four raptors being trained by a dinosaur researcher, Owen Grady (portrayed by Chris Pratt). When Trevorrow joined the project as director, he felt that the plot aspect of trained raptors was too extreme, as it depicted the animals being used for missions. Trevorrow reduced the level of cooperation that the raptors would have with their trainer. Early in the film, the raptors are being trained to not eat a live pig located in their enclosure; Trevorrow said that this "was as far as we should be able to go" with the concept of trained raptors. Owen's relationship with the raptors was inspired by real-life relationships that humans have with dangerous animals such as lions and alligators.

In Jurassic World, the raptors were created primarily through motion capture. A full-sized raptor model from the first film was also provided by Legacy Effects to ILM as a reference. Life-size maquettes were also used during scenes in which the raptors are caged. Audio recordings of penguins and toucans provided the raptor vocals. The sound effects of the raptors moving around were created by Benny Burtt, who attached microphones to his shoelaces and tromped around Skywalker Ranch, the film's sound-recording facility.

Several raptors are killed in Jurassic World, leaving only one survivor, a female individual named Blue.

In Jurassic World: Fallen Kingdom, Owen's past bond with Blue prompts him to join a mission to save her and other dinosaurs from Isla Nublar, after the island's volcano becomes active. For the film, Neal Scanlan's team created a Blue animatronic that was laid on an operating table, for a scene depicting the animal after an injury. The animatronic was operated by a dozen puppeteers hidden under the table. The scene was shot with and without the animatronic, and the two versions were combined during post-production. Modified penguin noises were used during this scene to provide a purring sound for Blue.

To create Blue's CGI appearances, the ILM animators referred to the previous film. David Vickery of ILM said that Blue's movements were designed to resemble a dog: "You look at the way Blue cocks her head and looks up at you. It's exactly like a dog. You're trying to sort of connect the dinosaur with things that you understand as a human". Small puppets were also used to depict Owen's raptors as babies. John Hankla, an advisor for Jurassic World: Fallen Kingdom, provided an accurately sized Velociraptor skeleton that appears in the background at the Lockwood Estate's library of dinosaur skeletons. It is the first accurately sized Velociraptor to appear in the franchise.

In Jurassic World: Dominion, Blue asexually reproduces a hatchling named Beta. Although Biosyn operatives kidnap Beta, Owen, with the help of Maisie Lockwood and Alan Grant, recaptures her and brings her back to Blue.

Blue is the focus of a two-part virtual reality miniseries, titled Jurassic World: Blue. It was released for Oculus VR headsets as a Fallen Kingdom tie-in. It depicts Blue on Isla Nublar at the time of the volcanic eruption.

Other creatures 
In the first film, a replica skeleton of Alamosaurus is present in the Jurassic Park visitor center. Parasaurolophus made a brief debut in the first film and has appeared in each one since then, including the short film Battle at Big Rock.

Mamenchisaurus appears briefly in The Lost World: Jurassic Park as one of the dinosaurs chased by Peter Ludlow's group. The Mamenchisaurus design was based on a maquette created by Winston's team. ILM then took the Brachiosaurus model from the first film and altered it to portray the Mamenchisaurus, which was fully computer-generated.

Ceratosaurus and Corythosaurus are introduced in Jurassic Park III, through brief appearances.

Allosaurus, Baryonyx, Carnotaurus, and Sinoceratops are introduced in Jurassic World: Fallen Kingdom. Baryonyx and Carnotaurus were among dinosaurs created through CGI. The Carnotaurus vocal sounds were made from orangutan noises, as well as Styrofoam, which was scraped with a double-bass bow. Sinoceratops makes several appearances in the film, including a scene in which the dinosaur is shown licking Owen after he has been sedated. Animator Jance Rubinchik described this as the dinosaur's motherly instinct to save Owen. The scene was shot using a prop tongue.

In Jurassic World: Fallen Kingdom, the skull of an unnamed ceratopsian is kept on display in Benjamin Lockwood's estate. Production designer Andy Nicholson said: "When it came to the ceratopsian skull which takes centre stage in Lockwood Manor, we were quite conscious that it couldn't be a Triceratops because it wouldn’t have been big enough to kill the Indoraptor. With that in mind, we created a new genus which was an amalgamation of two different ceratopsians". Several creatures appear in the film as dioramas, on display in Lockwood's estate. These include Concavenator, Dimetrodon, and Mononykus.

Allosaurus returns in Battle at Big Rock, which also introduces Nasutoceratops.

Jurassic World Dominion introduces several new creatures, including Atrociraptor, which Trevorrow described as more vicious than the Velociraptors. Another new creature is Lystrosaurus, a therapsid rather than a dinosaur, which is portrayed with the use of an animatronic. A group of living Dimetrodon also appear in the film. Microceratus, a favorite dinosaur of Trevorrow's, also makes its series debut in Dominion. Returning dinosaurs include Allosaurus, Baryonyx, Carnotaurus, and Nasutoceratops.

The prologue for Dominion introduces several other new creatures, including Dreadnoughtus, Iguanodon, Oviraptor, and the pterosaur Quetzalcoatlus. It also features Moros, a small, feathered member of the tyrannosaur family that was described in 2019. Moros also appears in the film itself, along with Quetzalcoatlus, Dreadnoughtus, and Iguanodon. Dreadnoughtus appears several times, and is depicted through CGI. Quetzalcoatlus is depicted with the exaggerated ability to tear apart an airplane, despite its light bodyweight. An Oviraptor appears in a deleted scene in Dominion, in which it is forced to fight a Lystrosaurus which bites its head off and wins the fight.

Notes

References 

Bibliography

External links 
Dinosaur profiles  at JurassicWorld.com
The Science of Jurassic Park and the Lost World (1997) by Rob DeSalle and David Lindley

Jurassic Park
Fictional endangered and extinct species
Lists of fictional reptiles and amphibians
Lists of fictional animals by work
Fictional clones
Fictional dinosaurs